Joplin Supply Company is a historic commercial building located at Joplin, Jasper County, Missouri.  It was built in 1922, and is a five-story, two-part vertical block commercial building.  It is a steel reinforced concrete structure with brick cladding and large multi-pane windows and simple stone detailing. 

It was listed on the National Register of Historic Places in 2007. It is located in the Joplin and Wall Avenues Historic District.

References

Individually listed contributing properties to historic districts on the National Register in Missouri
Commercial buildings on the National Register of Historic Places in Missouri
Commercial buildings completed in 1922
Buildings and structures in Joplin, Missouri
National Register of Historic Places in Jasper County, Missouri